FC Sibiu was a Romanian professional football club from Sibiu, Sibiu county, founded in 2003 and dissolved in 2007.

Honours
Liga II:
Runners-up (1): 2004–05
Liga III:
Winners (1): 2003–04

League history

Notable Managers
 Jean Gavrilă
 Marian Mihail
 Lucian Burchel
 Adrian Văsâi

References

Sibiu
Liga II clubs
Defunct football clubs in Romania
Football clubs in Sibiu County
Association football clubs established in 2003
Association football clubs disestablished in 2007
2003 establishments in Romania
2007 disestablishments in Romania